Philipp Albrecht, Duke of Württemberg (born Georg Philipp Albrecht Carl Maria Joseph Ludwig Hubertus Stanislaus Leopold Herzog von Württemberg; 14 November 1893 – 17 April 1975) was the son of Albrecht, Duke of Württemberg, and Archduchess Margarete Sophie of Austria. He was born in Stuttgart, and became head of the formerly reigning royal House of Württemberg on the death of his father on 29 October 1939. He died in Ravensburg, aged 81.

Marriages and children
His first marriage was to Archduchess Helena of Austria, Princess of Tuscany (born 30 October 1903 in Linz; died 8 September 1924 in Tübingen), daughter of Archduke Peter Ferdinand of Austria (younger son of Ferdinand IV, Grand Duke of Tuscany) and Princess Maria Cristina of Bourbon-Two Sicilies (daughter of Prince Alfonso, Count of Caserta), on 24 October 1923 in Altshausen. They had one daughter:

Duchess Maria Christina of Württemberg (born 2 September 1924), she married Prince Georg Hartman of Liechtenstein (son of Prince Aloys of Liechtenstein) on 23 September 1948. They have seven children and thirteen grandchildren.

Archduchess Helena died a week after giving birth to her daughter, Duchess Maria Christina.

His second marriage was to Archduchess Rosa of Austria, Princess of Tuscany (born 22 September 1906 in Parsch; died 17 September 1983 in Friedrichshafen), the sister of his late wife, on 1 August 1928 in Friedrichshafen. They had two sons and four daughters:

Duchess Helene of Württemberg (29 June 1929 – 22 April 2021), she married Federico Pallavicini, Marchese Pallavicini, on 23 August 1961. They have four children:
Maria Cristina Pallavicini (born 4 January 1963), she married Jens Bartram on 23 September 1995.
Antonietta Pallavicini (born 9 January 1964) 
Gabriella Pallavicini (born 23 April 1965), she married Ricardo Walter.
Giancarlo Pallavicini, Marchese Pallavicini (born 8 April 1967)
Duke Ludwig Albrecht of Württemberg (23 October 1930 – 6 October 2019), who renounced his rights to the House of Württemberg on 29 June 1959, married Baroness Adelheid von und zu Bodman on 16 February 1960 and they were divorced on 12 December 1970. They have three children. He remarried Angelika Kiessig on 14 August 1972 and they were divorced on 14 October 1988. They have one daughter.
Duke Christoph von Württemberg (born 30 November 1960), he married Iris Caren Metzger (19 November 1963 – 29 April 2022) on 29 December 2000. They had one daughter and one son.
Duchess Isabelle von Württemberg (born 30 November 1960), twin of Duke Christoph.
Duchess Sibylla von Württemberg (born 29 May 1963), she has one son with Wolfgang Merz.
Duchess Christiane von Württemberg (born 16 September 1973), she married Till Kitzing (born 26 August 1972) in 2003.
Duchess Elisabeth of Württemberg (2 February 1933 – 29 January 2022), she married Prince Antoine of Bourbon-Two Sicilies (20 January 1929 – 11 November 2019) on 18 July 1958. They have four children and two grandchildren.
Duchess Marie-Thérèse of Württemberg (born 12 November 1934), she married Prince Henri d'Orléans, Count of Paris on 5 July 1957 and they were divorced on 3 February 1984. They have five children and twelve grandchildren.
Carl, Duke of Württemberg (1 August 1936 – 7 June 2022), he married Princess Diane d'Orléans on 18 July 1960. They have six children and fourteen grandchildren. 
Duchess Maria Antonia of Württemberg (31 August 1937 – 12 November 2004).

Ancestry

References and notes

1893 births
1975 deaths
Pretenders to the throne of Württemberg
Dukes of Württemberg (titular)
Members of the Württembergian Chamber of Lords
Honorary Knights of the Teutonic Order
Knights of the Golden Fleece of Austria
Knights of the Order of Saint Joseph
Nobility from Stuttgart
German landowners
Grand Crosses of the Order of Saint Stephen of Hungary